This page list topics related to Muhammad Iqbal.

 Muhammad Iqbal's concept of Khudi
 Muhammad Iqbal's political philosophy
 Muhammad Iqbal's educational philosophy
 Madani–Iqbal debate
 Muhammad Iqbal bibliography
 Allahabad Address
 Works of Muhammad Iqbal
 Iqbal Academy Pakistan

Poem
 Iblees Ki Majlis-e-Shura
 Sare Jahan se Accha
 Tarana-e-Milli
 The Mosque of Cordoba
 Lab Pe Aati Hai Dua
 Khizr-i-Rah
 Saqi Namah
 Tulu'i Islam
 Khizr-i-Rah
 Gulshan-i Raz-i Jadid

Works by Iqbal
 The Call of the Marching Bell
 The Development of Metaphysics in Persia
 Gift from Hijaz
 Ilm Al-Iqtisad
 Javid Nama
 Message from the East
 The Reconstruction of Religious Thought in Islam
 The Rod of Moses
 Gabriel's Wing
 Persian Psalms
 Shikwa and Jawab-e-Shikwa
 The Secrets of the Self
 The Secrets of Selflessness
 What Should Then Be Done O People of the East

Works about Iqbal
 Glory of Iqbal
 Zinda Rood

Family members
 Javed Iqbal
 Nasira Iqbal
 Yousuf Salahuddin
 Walid Iqbal

Memorials
 Tomb of Allama Iqbal
 Javed Manzil
 Iqbal Stadium
 Iqbal Review
 Iqbal Manzil
 Iqbal Day
 Gulshan-e-Iqbal
 Greater Iqbal Park
 Dhobi Ghat Park (Faisalabad)
 Allama Iqbal Open University
 Allama Iqbal Medical College
 Allama Iqbal International Airport
 Plaza de Pakistán
 Tolu-e-Islam (magazine)

Iqbal scholars
 Syed Nazeer Niazi
 Aziz Ahmad
 Nasim Amrohvi
Arthur John Arberry
Jagan Nath Azad
Dewan Mohammad Azraf
Yousaf Saleem Chishti
Zaid Hamid
 Riffat Hassan
 Javed Iqbal
Ghulam Mustafa Khan
Ghulam Rasool Mehr
Muhammad Munawwar Mirza
Reynold A. Nicholson
Waheed Qureshi
Ayub Sabir
Israr Ahmad
Jawad Naqvi
Annemarie Schimmel
Ali Shariati
Eva de Vitray-Meyerovitch

Muhammad Iqbal